"Gentleman Who Fell" is the first single released by Milla Jovovich from her debut album, The Divine Comedy. It was released in March 1994 in the United Kingdom.

Written by Milla Jovovich with Mark R. Holden and Richard G. Feldman, the single peaked at No. 22 on the Billboard Modern Rock Tracks chart, spending seven weeks on it. A review in that publication by Larry Flick called the recording an "utterly charming single" with a melody that was a "breath of fresh air".

Track listing
 "Gentleman Who Fell"– 4:39
 "You Did It All Before" (Acoustic Version)– 3:58

References

1994 songs
1994 singles
Milla Jovovich songs
Songs written by Milla Jovovich
Songs written by Richard Feldman (songwriter)
Song recordings produced by Rupert Hine
SBK Records singles
Songs written by Mark Holden